Utilico Emerging Markets Trust plc  is a large British investment trust dedicated to investments in infrastructure, utility and related sectors in the emerging markets. Established in 2005, Utilico Emerging Markets Trust ('UEM') is a listed on the London Stock Exchange. The Chairman is John Rennocks.

UEM investments focuses predominantly on the emerging markets of Asia, Latin America, Emerging Europe and Africa. UEM is managed by ICM Limited and ICM Investment Management Limited, which is authorised and regulated by the Financial Conduct Authority.

Portfolio Summary 
Top 10 holdings as at 31 December 2022:

Directors 
 John Rennocks - Chairman of Utilico Emerging Markets Trust plc, Chairman of Bluefield Solar Income Fund plc and Chairman of AFC Energy plc
 Mark Bridgeman - Director of Law Debenture Corporation plc
 Susan Hansen – Director of Resimac Group Limited,  and Cognition Education Group
 Isabel Liu - Director of Schroder Oriental Income Fund Limited
 Eric Stobart - Chairman of Lloyds Superannuation Fund and Capita Managing Agency and a Director of BlackRock Throgmorton Trust

Awards 
UEM has won a number of awards, including:
 2016 Money Observer Trust Awards - Highly Commended, Best Emerging Market Trust
 2015 Moneywise Investment Trust Awards - Winner, Global Emerging Markets
 2014 Moneywise Investment Trust Awards - Winner, Global Emerging Markets

References

External links 

Investment trusts of the United Kingdom
Companies listed on the London Stock Exchange
Financial services companies established in 2005